Carlos Alcides González (born November 11, 1963, in Seguí, Argentina) is a former Argentine footballer who played for clubs of Argentina and Chile.

Career
Born in Seguí, González began playing football with local sides Club Atlético Patronato, Club Atletico Belgrano and Atlético de Rafaela before turning professional with Unión de Santa Fe aged 24. In 1992, González was part of Cobreloa's Chilean Primera División-winning side.

After he retired from playing, González joined football manager Gustavo Alfaro's staff, working with him for over a decade, including two spells with Arsenal de Sarandí.

Teams
  Unión de Santa Fe 1987-1990
  Cobreloa 1991-1992
  Deportes Iquique 1993
  Atlético Rafaela 1994-1995
  Huracán de Corrientes 1995-1997
  Atlético Rafaela 1997-2000

Titles
  Cobreloa 1992 (Chilean Championship)

References

External links
 

1963 births
Living people
Argentine footballers
Argentine expatriate footballers
Atlético de Rafaela footballers
Huracán Corrientes footballers
Unión de Santa Fe footballers
Deportes Iquique footballers
Cobreloa footballers
Expatriate footballers in Chile
Association football midfielders
Sportspeople from Entre Ríos Province